FGW may refer to:

 Fishguard & Goodwick railway station, in Wales
 First Great Western, now Great Western Railway, a British train operating company
 Flexural gravity wave